Nathan E. Edwards (1855 - 1908) was a state legislator in Arkansas. He represented Chicot County as a Republican for the 1893 session. He was one of at least four African Americans in the Arkansas House of Representatives in 1893 along with George W. Bell in the state senate. He and other Arkansas legislators were photographed in 1893.

He worked as a farmer, farm laborer, and minister  before and after his legislative service. He was a pastor in Eudora a First Baptist Church. He died 1908.

See also
African-American officeholders during and following the Reconstruction era

References

1855 births
1908 deaths
19th-century American politicians
Republican Party members of the Arkansas House of Representatives
Baptist ministers from the United States
African-American state legislators in Arkansas
People from Chicot County, Arkansas
19th-century American clergy
20th-century African-American people